The UK National Screening Committee co-ordinates the screening of people for medical conditions within the United Kingdom. Since April 2013 it has been part of Public Health England.

The committee was established in 1996, with Sir Kenneth Calman (Chief Medical Officer for England 1991–1998) as its first chairman. Professor Bob Steele (a specialist in colorectal cancer) has held the post since August 2016.

The committee maintains a list of policies in relation to various types of screening, and attempts to balance the risks against the benefits in each case. Some policies say that screening should be provided for everyone or some people, others that screening is not recommended. Each year it publishes a report reviewing its work.

In November 2013, the committee were involved in the testing of a new non-invasive prenatal blood test for Down's Syndrome at Great Ormond Street Hospital for Children.  Invasive screening methods, either amniocentesis or chorionic villus sampling, result in a miscarriage in 1 out of every 100 tests. An estimated 90% of women who learn that their child has Down's syndrome choose to have an abortion. The outcome of the test will not be healthier children with the syndrome, but fewer.

Leaders 

 Sir Kenneth Calman – 1996 to 1998
 Henrietta Campbell (Chief Medical Officer for Northern Ireland) – 1998 to 2006
 Dr Harry Burns (Chief Medical Officer, Scottish Government) – 2006 to 2013
 Professor David Walker (deputy Chief Medical Officer for England, PHE regional director) – 2013 to 2016
 Professor Bob Steele – since 2016

See also

 NHS health check

References

External links
 UK National Screening Committee at GOV.UK
 Population screening portal at GOV.UK

1996 establishments in the United Kingdom
Organizations established in 1996
Public Health England
Preventive medicine